Karakocalı can refer to:

 Karakocalı, Alanya
 Karakocalı, Sungurlu